Michael McFarland  is an American voice actor and ADR director who works on English dubs of Japanese anime at Funimation. He is known as the original English voice of Master Roshi and Yajirobe in Funimation's dubs of Dragon Ball and Dragon Ball Z. McFarland's other notable roles include Jean Havoc in Fullmetal Alchemist, Buggy the Clown in the Funimation dub of One Piece, and Jean Kirstein in Attack on Titan. He has voice directed on multiple Funimation titles including Dragon Ball, Fullmetal Alchemist, Case Closed, and Attack on Titan, the Rebuild of Evangelion films, and Summer Wars.

Filmography

Anime

===Animation===

Film

Video games

References

External links
 
 
 
 Mike McFarland at Crystal Acids English Voice Actor & Production Staff Database
 

Living people
American male voice actors
American voice directors
Male actors from Texas
American television writers
American male screenwriters
American male television writers
American casting directors
Year of birth missing (living people)